Charles Sidney Winder (October 18, 1829 – August 9, 1862), was a career United States Army officer and a Confederate general officer in the American Civil War. He was killed in action during the Battle of Cedar Mountain.

Early life and career
Winder was born in the town of Easton in Talbot County, Maryland, a nephew of future U.S. naval officer Franklin Buchanan and a second cousin to future Confederate general John H. Winder. He attended St. John's College, also located in Maryland. Then in 1846 he entered the United States Military Academy at West Point, and graduated 22nd of 44 cadets in 1850. He was appointed a brevet second lieutenant in the 4th U.S. Artillery. Exactly a year after leaving West Point, Winder was promoted to second lieutenant in the 3rd U.S. Artillery on July 1, 1851.

Winder served as the 3rd's Regimental Adjutant from April 4, 1854 to March 3, 1855, with a promotion to first lieutenant coming on April 5, 1854. In 1854, while en route to California, the vessel on which he was aboard, the San Francisco, was struck by a hurricane. For his valor in the face of this crisis, Winder was promoted to captain in the 9th U.S. Infantry on March 3, 1855, at the relatively young age of twenty-six.

He later saw action against Native Americans in the Washington Territory. At the outbreak of hostilities between North and South, he resigned from the Army in 1861.

Civil War service
Winder resigned his U.S. Army commission on April 1, 1861, and was appointed a captain of artillery in the Confederate Army on March 16, and then quickly promoted to major later that day. He was appointed colonel of the 6th South Carolina Infantry on July 8, leading it to prominence in the Confederate army.

He was promoted to brigadier general on March 1, 1862, and assigned to the Shenandoah Valley under the command of Stonewall Jackson. Having recently court-martialed Brig. Gen. Richard B. Garnett, Jackson placed Winder in command of his old brigade. This, combined with Winder's reputation as a strict disciplinarian, was widely resented by both the officers and men now under him. In fact, so general was the feeling of animosity toward him, by August 1862 it was widely rumored Winder would be shot by one of his own men in the next battle.

Winder ‘s men acknowledged he was personally a brave man. But his disciplinary tactics were considered severe enough that he was called “tyrannical” by his men. Winder was told by commanding General, Stonewall Jackson, to end his disciplinary practice of “bucking”.

Casler, John O. Four years in the Stonewall Brigade pgs 101-10

Cedar Mountain and death

On August 9, 1862, Winder led his men into battle at Cedar Mountain, on the left flank of the Confederate line. He did so despite having been ill for several days, and in defiance of a surgeon's order to rest. He was personally directing the fire of a battery when a Union shell struck him in his left side, horribly mangling him. Borne to the rear on a stretcher, Winder died later that evening.

Winder's body was initially buried in nearby Orange Court House, before being disinterred and transported to Richmond. There, a state funeral was given in his honor, followed by re-interment at Hollywood Cemetery. Three years later, his family had his body again removed, this time to be permanently buried in the family cemetery at Wye House, located near his birthplace of Easton, Maryland.

In his official report of the battle, Stonewall Jackson lamented General Winder's loss, writing,

See also

List of American Civil War generals (Confederate)

Notes

References
 Eicher, John H., and David J. Eicher, Civil War High Commands. Stanford: Stanford University Press, 2001. .
 Freeman, Douglas S. Lee's Lieutenants: A Study in Command. 3 vols. New York: Scribner, 1946. .÷
 Krick, Robert K. Stonewall Jackson at Cedar Mountain. Chapel Hill: University of North Carolina Press, 1990. .
 Sifakis, Stewart. Who Was Who in the Civil War. New York: Facts On File, 1988. .
 Tanner, Robert G., Stonewall in the Valley: Thomas J. "Stonewall" Jackson's Shenandoah Valley Campaign, Spring 1862, Stackpole Books, 1996.
 U.S. War Department, The War of the Rebellion: a Compilation of the Official Records of the Union and Confederate Armies, U.S. Government Printing Office, 1880–1901.
 Warner, Ezra J. Generals in Gray: Lives of the Confederate Commanders. Baton Rouge: Louisiana State University Press, 1959. .

External links
 Official Records: Series 1, Vol XII, Part II

Confederate States Army brigadier generals
United States Military Academy alumni
United States Army officers
Confederate States of America military personnel killed in the American Civil War
People from Talbot County, Maryland
People of Maryland in the American Civil War
Stonewall Brigade
1829 births
1862 deaths
St. John's College (Annapolis/Santa Fe) alumni